School-to-work transition is a phrase referring to on-the-job training, apprenticeships, cooperative education agreements or other programs designed to prepare students to enter the job market. This education system is primarily employed in the United States, partially as a response to work training as it is done in Asia.

School to Work is a system to introduce the philosophy of school-based, work-based, and connecting activities as early as kindergarten to expose students to potential future careers. School to Work emphasizes lifelong learning.

School to Work is funded and sponsored at the federal level by the U.S. Department of Labor and U.S. Department of Education. At the state level in states like Arizona, the grant is administered by the Arizona Department of Commerce, School to Work Division. This grant was funded for a maximum of five years with decreasing funds years three through five.

An example of county level involvement is the Cochise County School to Work Consortia in Arizona.  It is composed of more than fifty Cochise County public and private schools, kindergarten through four-year university level, local and community-based organizations, and more than one hundred supporting business partners.

STW is part of a comprehensive education reform movement which includes formulating new standards which emphasize higher order thinking skills, new standards based assessments, and graduation exams, such as the Certificate of Initial Mastery which insure that students are ready for job training or college prep by age 16. Reformers believe that it is important and egalitarian that all students graduate ready for jobs and ready for college, rather than tracking students one way or the other.

Critics 

"Back to basics" traditionalists observe that in Europe, apprenticeships typically mean that the worker essentially ends their formal education after age 16, and works full-time at reduced pay in exchange for learning "job skills" such as assembling automobiles. Some believe that it was better to have students who were not bound for college concentrate on career schools, while academic students should spend class time learning core academic subjects such as history or science rather than job-shadowing at a hospital or auto dealer. A student in North Dakota would have little opportunity to learn to be an auto designer, while one in Alabama would have little opportunity to do job shadowing at a major software company if job training were allocated according to local human resource needs, as many programs are structured. Local businesses also need to structure their operations to accommodate student workers, and transportation since typically schools are situated close to homes, and not businesses which are typically a car or transit commute away from homes.

The Michigan STW Initiative states "students work without pay for two to three hours each day" and "students are able to perform what might otherwise be hazardous order work." which would contradict child labor laws.  Data would be shared with state STW partnership network and local labor market areas which might be an invasion of privacy. The state would utilize the national industry-recognized skill certificates when developed, which would be the Certificate of Initial Mastery. Critics call this a government-controlled passport to work. Michigan Rep. Harold J. Voorhees expressed concern that, with full implementation, a child would not be employed without this Certificate.

See also 
 Outcome-based education

Notes 

Education reform
Internships
Apprenticeship